Laura Davis (born November 26, 1973) is a retired American female volleyball player. She was part of the United States women's national volleyball team at the 1998 FIVB Volleyball Women's World Championship in Japan. In 1995, she won the Honda-Broderick Award (now the Honda Sports Award) as the nation's best female collegiate volleyball player.

References

External links
http://www.ohiostatebuckeyes.com/sports/w-volley/spec-rel/083105aad.html

1973 births
Living people
American women's volleyball players
Place of birth missing (living people)
Big Ten Athlete of the Year winners
Ohio State Buckeyes women's volleyball players